The Puch Bridge, officially the Bridge over the Drava River in Ptuj, is an extradosed bridge over the Drava River near lake Ptuj in northeastern Slovenia. It is named after the inventor Johann Puch (1862–1914). It was built from October 2005 until May 2007, when it was opened for traffic. Its architects were Peter Gabrijelčič and Viktor Markelj, who was also its constructor.

References

Extradosed bridges
Extradosed bridges in Slovenia
Pedestrian bridges in Slovenia
Bridges over the Drava
Bridges completed in 2007
21st-century architecture in Slovenia